Scottish Co-operative Wholesale Society Ltd v Meyer [1959] AC 324 is a UK company law case, concerning the predecessor of the unfair prejudice provision, an action for "oppression" under section 210 of the Companies Act 1948 (now section 994 of the Companies Act 2006).

The judgement remains a leading precedent for the clear statement that the duty of care of a  director is to the company itself, and not to the interests of particular shareholders. It also illustrates the reluctance of English law to "admit the reality of interrelated companies acting in any way other than as a number of separate entities tied together by their relationship as significant shareholders in each other."

Facts
The Scottish Co-operative Wholesale Society Ltd. set up a new company called "Scottish Textile & Manufacturing Co Ltd" with Dr Meyer and Mr Lucas. They manufactured rayon cloth. Back then, one required state licensing and to get a license experienced managers were needed. Dr Meyer and Mr Lucas were the managing directors, with some shares, while the Scottish Co-op held the majority of the company's shares and appointed the other three directors to the board. These three were also directors of the Scottish Co-op itself. In 1952, the licensing system was ended by the government. So Scottish Co-op used its majority of votes to transfer all the business to a branch of the Co-op. It also cut off the supplies of raw materials. The company could not continue, no profits were made and the share value crashed. Mr Meyer and Mr Lucas felt oppressed and petitioned for relief under section 210 of the Companies Act 1948. Lord Denning said,

Judgment
The House of Lords held that the conduct of the majority was indeed oppressive, and ordered that Dr Meyer and Mr Lucas' shares be bought at a price that was fair. Lord Denning's speech continued.

See also
UK company law

Notes

References
Dine, Janet and Koutsias, Marios, Corporate Law, 6th edn, Palgrave Macmillan, London, 2008, 

United Kingdom company case law
1959 in British law
Lord Denning cases
House of Lords cases
1959 in case law
Co-operatives in Scotland